Sir Daniel McGarvey, CBE (16 September 1919 – 26 April 1977) was a British trade unionist.

McGarvey was born in Clydebank and attended Our Holy Redeemer School, then St Patrick's High School, Dumbarton.  At the age of fifteen, he began working as an apprentice caulker.

He became active in the United Society of Boilermakers and Iron and Steel Shipbuilders, being elected to its general council in 1951, and in 1954 to the executive council of the Confederation of Shipbuilding and Engineering Unions. From 1958-65, he served on the National Executive Council of the Labour Party. In 1964, he was elected as General Secretary of the renamed Amalgamated Society of Boilermakers, Shipwrights, Blacksmiths and Structural Workers.

In 1965, he was elected to the General Council of the Trades Union Congress (TUC), and he became the President of the TUC in 1976, but died the following April, before completing his term.

Honours
McGarvey received the CBE in 1970, and was knighted shortly before his death.

References

1919 births
1977 deaths
Knights Bachelor
Commanders of the Order of the British Empire
General Secretaries of the Amalgamated Society of Boilermakers
Members of the General Council of the Trades Union Congress
People educated at Our Lady & St Patrick's High School
People from Clydebank
Presidents of the Trades Union Congress
Scottish Roman Catholics
Scottish people of Irish descent